Ctenophorinia is a genus of bristle flies in the family Tachinidae. There are at least four described species in Ctenophorinia.

Species
These four species belong to the genus Ctenophorinia:
 Ctenophorinia adiscalis Mesnil, 1963 c g
 Ctenophorinia christianae Ziegler & Shima, 1996 c g
 Ctenophorinia frontalis Ziegler & Shima, 1996 c g
 Ctenophorinia grisea Mesnil, 1967 c g
Data sources: i = ITIS, c = Catalogue of Life, g = GBIF, b = Bugguide.net

References

Further reading

External links

 
 

Tachinidae